Henry Broadley (1793–1851) was a British Conservative politician who sat in the House of Commons from 1837 to 1851.

Broadley was a member of the Broadley family of merchants, bankers and landowners of Hull. He was first chairman of the Hull and Selby Railway Company from 1836 to 1843.

At the 1837 general election, Broadley was elected Member of Parliament for  East Riding of Yorkshire and held it until his death in 1851.

Broadley bought Welton House, Yorkshire, in 1848. On his death it passed to his sister, Sophia Broadley, who died in 1864, and then to his nephew William Harrison-Broadley.  When he also died unmarried it passed to his nephew, Henry Broadley Harrison-Broadley.

References

External links 
 

1793 births
1851 deaths
Conservative Party (UK) MPs for English constituencies
UK MPs 1837–1841
UK MPs 1841–1847
UK MPs 1847–1852
Hull and Selby Railway